The Wubbulous World of Dr. Seuss  is an American children's puppet television series based on characters created by Dr. Seuss, produced by The Jim Henson Company. It aired from October 13, 1996, to December 28, 1998, on Nickelodeon. It combines  live puppets with digitally animated backgrounds, and in its first season, refashioning characters and themes from the original Dr. Seuss books into new stories that often retained much of the flavor of Dr. Seuss' own works.

Format
In many respects, seasons one and two of the program are very different shows. The two seasons have completely different intro and outro credit sequences and songs reflecting their differing orientations. The virtual settings seen in this show are created by Jim Henson's Creature Shop.

Season One
Each episode is a self-contained story based on Dr. Seuss characters such as Yertle the Turtle and Horton the Elephant. The unifying element is that the stories are introduced and commented on by The Cat in the Hat (performed by Bruce Lanoil) who serves as host of the show. Occasionally, The Cat in the Hat himself appears in the episode, reprising his role as a bit of a trickster, as in his original eponymous books (ex. episode 1.6: "The Simplifier").

Season one is notable for hewing closely to many of the themes of the original Dr. Seuss stories, which often had a strong moral overtone. As a result, some episodes have distinctly dark or sinister elements which, like some Dr. Seuss books, may not be appropriate for younger children.

Season Two
For season two, the show was reworked along the lines of a more traditional children's program. The Cat in the Hat (now performed by a much less gravelly sounding Martin P. Robinson) lives in a playhouse with his Little Cats A through Z and the often flustered Terrence McBird (performed by Anthony Asbury). Aside from the residents of the house there are usually visitors based on Dr. Seuss characters. Each episode revolves around a theme (such as family, health, art) and features one or two songs about the theme. A closing song was also added at the end of each episode. The action shifts between The Cat in the Hat and what is going on in his playhouse and shorter related story interludes, which he shows to the audience by means of his "Wubbuloscope". These story vignettes take place in various locations like:

 Seussville – a contemporary city where Sarah Hall Small and her family live.
 Jungle of Nool – a jungle that is home to Horton the Elephant, Morton the Elephant-Bird, Jane Kangaroo, Junior Kangaroo, Yertle the Turtle, the Wickershams, and the Sneels.
 Kingdom of Didd – a Renaissance-like kingdom that is ruled by King Derwin.
 Mount Crumpit – home of the Grinch and his dog, Max.

The tone of season two is much lighter, as the result of bringing in a number of comedic writers such as Adam Felber and Mo Rocca. The Cat in the Hat is no longer a trickster and instead has assumed the role of a friendly and enthusiastic host who is helpful, nurturing and sweet. Although this revised format only lasted one season before the show ended, the format was recognizably previously featured in Jim Henson Productions' next children's program Bear in the Big Blue House, which aired on Disney Channel.

Characters

Main
 The Cat in the Hat (performed and voiced by Bruce Lanoil in Season 1 and Martin P. Robinson in Season 2) is the main protagonist and host of the series. He starts out as a trickster, then becomes a more nurturing host.
 The Little Cats debuted in The Cat in the Hat Comes Back.
 Little Cat A (performed and voiced by Kathryn Mullen in Season 1 and Leslie Carrara-Rudolph in Season 2) – seen as one of the Cat in the Hat's sidekicks.
 Little Cat B (performed and voiced by Stephanie D'Abruzzo) – seen as one of the Cat in the Hat's sidekicks.
 Little Cat C (performed and voiced by John Kennedy) – seen as one of the Cat in the Hat's sidekicks.
 Little Cat F (performed and voiced by Pam Arciero) – seen in Season 2 at the Cat in the Hat's playhouse.
 Little Cat N (performed and voiced by Pam Arciero) – seen in Season 2 at the Cat in the Hat's playhouse.
 Little Cat P (performed and voiced by Tim Lagasse) – seen in Season 2 at the Cat in the Hat's playhouse.
 Little Cat S (performed and voiced by Stephanie D'Abruzzo) – seen in Season 2 at the Cat in the Hat's playhouse.
 Little Cat Z (performed and voiced by Anthony Asbury) – seen in Season 2 at the Cat in the Hat's playhouse. He is the smallest of all and mutters Z-words.
 Little Cat Fleep (performed and voiced by Kevin Clash) is an indifferent little cat who only speaks in fleeps.
 Terrence McBird (performed and voiced by Anthony Asbury) is a bird that joins the main cast in Season 2. He is the cats roommate, and is often grumpy throughout his daily activities in each episode until the end.

Supporting 
 The Grinch (performed and voiced by Anthony Asbury) – he appeared in How the Grinch Stole Christmas!. He likes to dampen other people's fun and pleasure for his own vile and sadistic amusement. He serves as the main antagonist of the series.
 Max the Dog (performed and voiced by Kathryn Mullen in Season 1 and Stephanie D'Abruzzo in Season 2) – he appeared in How the Grinch Stole Christmas!. Max is the Grinch's long-suffering yet loyal dog.
 Fox in Socks and Mr. Knox (performed and voiced by Bruce Lanoil in Season 1 and Tim Lagasse in Season 2 and John Kennedy respectively) – they came from Fox in Socks. Fox is lively and Knox is moody and easily annoyed. The only episode where Fox appeared without Knox is "The Sounds All Around".
 Yertle the Turtle (performed and voiced by Anthony Asbury) – Yertle is a turtle who tries to be king of anything, and usually uses other characters to his advantage. He serves as a major antagonist of the series, especially in season 1.
 Horton the Elephant (performed and voiced by John Kennedy) – he appeared in Horton Hatches the Egg and Horton Hears a Who!. He is a friendly, humble and steadfast elephant who often receives ridicule for believing in things that no one else does.
 Morton the Elephant-Bird (performed and voiced by Kathryn Mullen in Season 1 and Leslie Carrara-Rudolph in Season 2) is a Horton's half-bird son who appeared in Horton Hatches the Egg.
 Jane Kangaroo (performed and voiced by Stephanie D'Abruzzo) – she appeared in Horton Hears a Who!. She is a very snobbish and strict kangaroo who is portrayed in this series in a more sympathetic light than her book counterpart.
 Junior Kangaroo (performed and voiced by Kathryn Mullen in Season 1 and Tim Lagasse in Season 2) – he appeared in Horton Hears a Who! and is the son of Jane Kangaroo. By season 2, he and Morton have become friends.
 Thidwick the Big-Hearted Moose (performed and voiced by Anthony Asbury) is a moose who is very loving and sweet. In this show, Thidwick is also Horton the Elephant's adoptive younger brother and Morton the Elephant-Bird's adoptive uncle as seen in "The Birthday Moose". Thidwick was later dropped from the show at the end of Season 1.
 The Wickersham Brothers (performed and voiced by John Kennedy, Anthony Asbury, and Bruce Lanoil) is a family of apes who come from Horton Hears a Who! and are often employed by Jane Kangaroo and/or Yertle the Turtle.
 Sarah Hall Small (performed and voiced by Stephanie D'Abruzzo) is a girl who is a resident of Seussville. She debuted during the second season.
 Sam-I-Am (performed and voiced by John Kennedy) – he appeared in Green Eggs and Ham. He appeared in Season 2 where he would often lend a hand to the Cat in the Hat.
 Sue Snue (performed and voiced by Stephanie D'Abruzzo) is a girl who is a resident of Seussville and appeared in season 1.

Minor
 Mayor Stovepipe (performed and voiced by Kathryn Mullen) is the mayor of Seussville who appeared in season 1.  
 Matthew Katroom (performed and voiced by Anthony Asbury) is a boy who is a resident of Seussville and is good friends with Sarah Hall Small.
 Pam-I-Am (performed and voiced by Stephanie D'Abruzzo) is a female counterpart of Sam-I-Am and expert repair girl. The Cat in the Hat often uses the Pam Phone to call on her. Her motto is "Pam-I-Am, fix it I can!"
 The Birthday Bird (performed and voiced by John Kennedy) appeared in Happy Birthday to You! He lives in Katroo and he likes to celebrate birthdays.
 Sally Spingel-Spungel-Sporn (performed by Camille Bonora in "The Muckster" and Stephanie D'Abruzzo in "Max the Hero" and "Horton Has a Hit") is a news reporter who came from The Cat in the Hat Song Book.
 King Derwin (performed and voiced by Anthony Asbury) is the King of the Kingdom of Didd who came from The 500 Hats of Bartholomew Cubbins.
 Princess Tizz (performed and voiced by Leslie Carrara-Rudolph) is the daughter of King Derwin.
 Norval the Fish (performed and voiced by John Kennedy) – he appeared from You're Only Old Once! Norval would appear in different roles in the show. Around Season 2, Norval would work as an advisor to the King Derwin of the Kingdom of Didd.
 Milo (performed and voiced by John Kennedy) is a boy who resides in the Kingdom of Didd and serves as King Derwin's page.
 The Yapper-Nap (performed and voiced by John Kennedy) is a monster likes to takes nap in Seussville.
 Snark is a pink bird that appears and lives in the Jungle of Nool. She is seen in Season 2. Snark is a recycled version of Shirley from The Muppet Show.
 Sneels (performed and voiced by Kathryn Mullen, Heather Asch, Bruce Lanoil and Stephanie D'Abruzzo) is a race of green and pink furry creatures that live in the Jungle of Nool. They were previously used as background cave creatures in Fraggle Rock, as well as its animated series, but had different eyes here. Their babies, years after the adults first debuted on the aforementioned production, also debuted here.
 Mick Maputo Bird (performed and voiced by Anthony Asbury) is an Elvis Presley-themed bird that lives in the Jungle of Nool who is also seen in season 2. He sings "Out in the Jungle" in the episode "The Cat in the Hat's Indoor Picnic".
 Lester McBird (performed and voiced by Joey Mazzarino) is Terrence McBird's twin brother who is very sensitive towards things he doesn't like and speaks in an upper English accent.

Episodes

Series overview

Season 1 (1996–97)

Season 2 (1998)

Puppeteers
 Bruce Lanoil – The Cat in the Hat (1996–1997), Fox in Socks (1996–1997), Alonzo, Announcer, Aunt May, Barney Balaban, Big Nosed Whozit, Big-Bottomed Rumpit, Bob the King of the Wickershams, First Mate, Grandpa Mullally, Green-Tufted Sneel (in "Yertle the King"), The Grinch's Singing Voice (in "The Guest"), Haji, The Hum-Bleeper, King Noogle of Nug, Larry Nooly, Little Wimpy Guy (puppetry only), Mayor's Servant, Money Whozit, Morton's Pink Friend, Mr. Webley, Newsboy, Onlooker #2, Pa Blozzit, Ronald Q. Clark, Yertle the Turtle (assistant in "The King's Beard"), Singing Classmate in Play, Subscription-Selling Whozit, Tiger, Uncle Dutter, Unhappy Man, The Wickershams, Zander, Zauber
 Martin P. Robinson – The Cat in the Hat (1998), Civil Servant #1, Civil Servant #2, Civil Servant #5, Civil Servant #6, The Milk, The Old Man, Goober the Dog, Paul Hall Small, Yertle the Turtle (assistant in "A Bird's Best Friend"), Friver McGee, Flying Dog, Oven
 Anthony Asbury – Terrence McBird, Little Cat Z, The Grinch, Yertle the Turtle, Thidwick the Big-Hearted Moose, Matthew Katroom, King Derwin, Mr. Hall Small, 8th Birthday Glurk, Bald Eagle with Toupee, Bullfrog, Charlie, Dad Tidbiddle, Footman, Gink, Grandpa Jacob Kangaroo, Little Guy in Machine, Mick Maputo Bird, Morris Nooly, Morton's Purple Friend, Mrs. Zabarelli, Onlooker #3, The Royal Herald, Singing Classmate in Play, Uncle Bocks, Uncle Schmeeze, Voice from Globe, Waldo F. Sterling, The Wickershams
 Stephanie D'Abruzzo – Little Cat B, Little Cat S, Jane Kangaroo, Max the Dog (1998), Pam-I-Am, Sarah Hall Small, Admiral Abigail Breeze, Annie DeLoo, Backup Singer, Bunny, The Cheese, Civil Servant #4, Daisy-Head Mayzie, Dolores Nooly, Dr. Gazeat, Elise, Eskimo Kid, Fiona Phish, Goofy Gargaloof, Green-Tufted Sneel, Happy Announcer, Heather Tidbiddle, Iguana from Xanadu, Lady Fretibula, Lady from "Up With Folks", Lulu, Ma Blozzit, Mandy, Mom Jalloo, Morton's Yellow Friend, Mrs. Dorfman, Nola Nicola Raphaella Miraldo, Poodle That Doodles, Sally Spingel-Spungel-Sporn (in "Max the Hero" and "Horton Has a Hit"), Space Creature, Sue Snue, Tallullah, The Travel Poohbah, Web-Footed Batula, White-Tuffted Floozle Bird
 John Kennedy – Little Cat C, Horton the Elephant, Mr. Knox, Norval the Fish, Sam-I-Am, Felix Finkledooper, Milo, Alvin, Announcer, Armand, Backup Singer, The Birthday Bird, Celli, Delivery Bird, Downer Than Down Whozit, Earl, Flitzpizzle, The Grinch (assistant in "The Guest" and "There is Nothing to Fear in Here"), Hairy, Herbie Tidbiddle, Horace P. Riddley, Irish Setter, Julian Jeremy Jaroo Jalloo, King Lindy of Lime, Little Wimpy Guy (voice), Man from "Up With Folks", McZuff, Money Whozit, Mr. Dorfman, Muckster, Narrator, Nervous Whozit, Picnic Bug, Raffle Ticket-Selling Kid, Rock Singer, Royal Archer, Singing Lion, Spaceman, Thaddeus, Uncle Docks, Uncle Dutter (assistant), Uncle Norton the Elephant, The Wickershams, Yapper-Nap
 Kathryn Mullen – Little Cat A (1996–1997), Junior Kangaroo (1996–1997), Max the Dog (1996-1997), Morton the Elephant Bird (1996–1997), The Grinch (assistant in "The Guest"), Aunt Mertle, Babs Balaban, Backup Singer, Civil Servant #3, Daisy's Mom, Disgusted Guest, Down Whozit, Eliza Jane Dorfman, Finnegan, Gertrude, Hopwood, Mayor Stovepipe, Molly Livingood, Mom Tidbiddle, Money Whozit, Mrs. Orissa Buttons, Onlooker #1, Number One, Phone Operator, Pink-Tufted Sneel, Princess Mindy, Queen Regina of Ka-Larry, The Sandwich, Singing Classmate in Play, Squirrel, The Teacher, Tubby Tarbaloot, Verma
 Leslie Carrara-Rudolph – Little Cat A (1998), Morton the Elephant Bird (1998), Princess Tizz, Mrs. Hall Small, Grandma Hall Small, Grox, Sadie the dog
 Tim Lagasse – Little Cat P, Fox in Socks (1998), Junior Kangaroo (1998), Annoying Greebles, Ben, Bunky Balaban, The Clam, Eskimo Kid, The Grinch's Right Hand Puppeteer (in "The Song Of the Zubble Wump"), Mr. Moriarty Seagoin Eccles, Old Man Time, Scotty, Sid Spider, The Speaker, Smooch Smooch the pooch, Weasel from Sleezeldoo, Mink, Civil Servant #9
 Pam Arciero – Little Cat F, Little Cat N, Lulu's Dog, Zubble-Wump, Snake, Mama Gink
 Bill Barretta – Uncle Berklummer
 Joey Mazzarino – Elwood the Jester (in "The King's Beard"), Lester McBird (in "Lester Leaps In")
 Vicki Eibner – Puffy the Cat (in "Cat's Play"), Snooty Bird
 Heather Asch – Sneels
 Nikki Tilroe – Civil Servant #7, Poochie the poodle
 Brian Meehl – Binkham Tamino McDoyal the Third 
 Camille Bonora – Sally Spingel-Spungel-Sporn (in "The Muckster")
 Jim Kroupa – Annoying Greebles, Dad Jalloo, Doily-Cart, Mr. Wimpletwerp, Space Creature, Zippedy Quick
 Jerry Nelson – Snoozer
 John Tartaglia – Bird ( in "The King's Beard"), Delivery Man
 Kevin Clash – Little Cat Fleep

Home video releases
The series was never systematically issued to home video on either VHS or DVD. Some VHS tapes were distributed by Columbia TriStar Home Video in 1999. Current DVD releases contain three episodes per disc and are a mix of episodes from the first and second seasons.

In 2015, the whole series was released on DVD from Shock Entertainment in Australia.

Syndication
Nickelodeon aired the series from October 13, 1996 to 1998, with reruns airing until February 6, 2000.

Starz Kids & Family began carrying reruns of the series in 2018.

Later appearances
 The puppet used for Annie DeLoo was later used in It's a Very Merry Muppet Christmas Movie, for Billy in episode 17 of Statler and Waldorf: From the Balcony, in Puppet Up! alongside the Flitzpizzle and another Whatnot from this show as well as other productions including The Happytime Murders.
 Each of the Whozits have appeared as different characters in Mopatop's Shop, and years after the purchase of The Muppets, started appearing on Henson Alternative productions.
 Oddly, one of the Wickersham Brothers was rarely used outside of the Dr. Seuss series, seen on a couple of Sesame Street segments, the "Jump" song (with India Arie) on the Happy Healthy Monsters resource video, and as the Nascount Greasemonkey from Episode 4154.
 The Wubbulous World of Dr. Seuss aired in reruns on Semillitas and Starz Kids.

References

External links
 

1990s American children's television series
1990s Nickelodeon original programming
1996 American television series debuts
1998 American television series endings
1990s preschool education television series
American preschool education television series
American television series with live action and animation
American television shows based on children's books
American television shows featuring puppetry
Nick Jr. original programming
Television series about birds
Television series about cats
Television series about elephants
Television series by The Jim Henson Company
Television shows based on works by Dr. Seuss
Horton the Elephant
The Cat in the Hat
English-language television shows